Boyd is a census-designated place and unincorporated community in Carbon County, Montana, United States. As of the 2010 census it had a population of 35. Boyd was a stop on the Northern Pacific Railway en route to Red Lodge. A post office was first established at Boyd on March 12, 1909 with Roland N. Doughty as the town's first postmaster. Since December 3, 1965, the office has operated as a rural station or a CPO of Roberts with the ZIP code of 59013.

As a station for the Northern Pacific Railway, Boyd prospered. Once travel by automobile became common, the town's economy declined.

Situated on U.S. Route 212, Boyd is about 21 miles from Red Lodge. The turnoff to Cooney Reservoir is in town.

Demographics

References

Census-designated places in Carbon County, Montana
Billings metropolitan area
Unincorporated communities in Carbon County, Montana
Unincorporated communities in Montana